The 1981 Swiss Indoors was a men's tennis tournament played on indoor hard courts at the St. Jakobshalle in Basel, Switzerland that was part of the 1981 Volvo Grand Prix. It was the 13th edition of the tournament and was held from 12 October through 18 October 1981. First-seeded Ivan Lendl won the singles title.

Finals

Singles
 Ivan Lendl defeated  José Luis Clerc 6–2, 6–3, 6–0
 It was Lendl's 6th singles title of the year and the 13th of his career.

Doubles
 Ilie Năstase /  José Luis Clerc defeated  Markus Günthardt /  Pavel Složil 7–6, 6–7, 7–6

References

External links
 Official website 
 ITF tournament edition details

Swiss Indoors
Swiss Indoors
1981 in Swiss tennis